A salt spoon is a miniature utensil used with an open salt cellar for individual service. It is a historical and nostalgic item from a time before table salt was free-flowing, as it is today. The spoon itself ranges from 2 to 3 inches (5 to 7.5 cm) long and has a circular bowl measuring approximately 0.5 to 0.75 inches (1.25 to 2 cm). They can be found in a wide range of materials including glass, Sterling silver, plastic, wood, ivory, bone and shell.  

As a unit of measurement in old recipes, 1 salt spoon (ssp) = 0.25 teaspoon, or slightly more than 1 ml.

History 
The salt spoons are quite new and apparently were not used until the 18th century. Design of these small spoons closely followed the design of the table spoons. The bowls tended to be of the round shape, with the exception of the cases where the bowl was unusual to accommodate some fantastic form of the overall spoon design.

Salt absorbs moisture from its surroundings, and had a tendency to clump together into one large lump. The head of the household usually presided over the distribution of salt at the dining table. This lump of salt was placed into a small dish, called by various names - open salt, salt cellar, table salt. Today we also refer to these as Master salts. It was then broken up with a knife handle or other utensil and placed into smaller, individual salt cellars, often matching the larger one in design. Since salt was such a precious seasoning, only small portions were given to each person at the table. Diners could either dip food into their individual salt cellars or use a small salt spoon to sprinkle the seasoning over their food. 

In the early 1930s, a process was developed which coats each grain of salt with the anti-caking agent and keeps them from sticking together. Due to these changes in the processing of salt for consumer use, the open salt cellar and its accompanying salt spoon have become largely obsolete, having been replaced by the everyday salt shakers. They are, however, a highly collectable item and are still used today on some dining tables, out of a sense of nostalgia.

Notes

Sources 
 

Spoons
Serving utensils
Edible salt